F1 Academy is an all-female single-seater racing championship founded by Formula One with its inaugural season in 2023.

History 
In November 2022, Formula One announced the creation of F1 Academy, a racing series for women aimed to focus on developing and preparing young drivers to progress to higher levels of competition. It was created to help smoothen the transition from karting to the single-seater ladder. The series was confirmed to consist of five teams with experience in Formula 2 and Formula 3, with each team entering 3 cars to make up a 15-car grid.

The five teams taking part in the 2023 season were announced in December 2022 to be ART Grand Prix, Campos Racing, Rodin Carlin, MP Motorsport and Prema Racing.

On 1 March 2023, Susie Wolff was appointed the managing director for the series.

Championship format 
The 2023 season will consist of seven event weekends with three races each, amounting to a total of 21 races, plus fifteen days of official testing. One of the seven events is expected to be a Formula One support race.

Cars 
The cars used for the 2023 season were confirmed by Formula One to be the Tatuus F4-T421 chassis used in Formula 4 championships globally since 2022, paired with turbocharged engines supplied by Autotecnica, capable of delivering 165 horsepower, and tyres provided by F1 partner Pirelli. Formula One subsidises the cost of each car with a budget of €150,000, with the drivers covering the rest.

2023 Calendar

See also
W Series

References

External links 
 
 Official website of 
 

Formula racing series
One-make series
F1 Academy